Operators of the Douglas DC-7 past and present:

Civil operators

SABENA - received 10 DC-7Cs as new build aircraft.

ARCO Bermuda

Panair do Brasil - received 4 DC-7Cs as new build aircraft.

Pacific Western Airlines

Conair
Flying Enterprise
Scandinavian Airlines System - received 14 DC-7Cs as new build aircraft.

AREA Ecuador

Transports Aériens Intercontinentaux - received 3 DC-7Cs as new build aircraft.
Transports Aériens Réunis

Affretair

Atlantis
Sudflug

Transportes Aéreos Nacionales (TAN Airlines)

Persian Air Services

Aer Turas
Shannon Air

Alitalia - received 6 DC-7Cs as new build aircraft.

Air Caribbean Transport

Japan Air Lines - received 4 DC-7Cs as new build aircraft.

Royal Jordanian Airlines

Lebanese International Airways

Mexicana - received 3 DC-7Cs as new build aircraft.

KLM - received 15 DC-7Cs as new build aircraft.
Martinair
Schreiner Airways

Scandinavian Airlines System

Aerovías Panamá
Talingo Airlines

Aerolíneas Peruanas

Fleeming Air System Transport

Spantax
TAE – Trabajos Aéreos y Enlaces
TASSA
Transeuropa Compañía de Aviación

Affretair
Air Trans Africa

South African Airways - received 4 DC-7Bs as new build aircraft.

Internord
Ostermanair Charter
Scandinavian Airlines System
Swedish Red Cross
Transair Sweden

Swissair - received 5 DC-7Cs as new build aircraft.

British Overseas Airways Corporation - received 10 DC-7Cs as new build aircraft.
Caledonian Airways
Dan-Air
Trans Meridian

Air Tankers
Airlinft International
American Airlines - received 34 DC-7s and 24 DC-7Bs as new build aircraft.
Braniff Airways - received 7 DC-7Cs as new build aircraft.
Continental Air Lines - received 6 DC-7Bs as new build aircraft.
Delta Air Lines - received 10 DC-7s and 11 DC-7Bs as new build aircraft. 
Eastern Air Lines - received 50 DC-7Bs as new build aircraft.
Federal Aviation Administration
Interocean Airlines
Liberty Air
National Airlines - received 4 DC-7s and 4 DC-7Bs as new build aircraft.
Northwest Orient Airlines - received 14 DC-7Cs as new build aircraft.
Overseas National Airways
Pan American-Grace Airways - received 6 DC-7Bs as new build aircraft.
Pan American World Airways - received 7 DC-7Bs and 26 DC-7Cs as new build aircraft.
Riddle Airlines
Saturn Airways
Standard Airways
United Airlines - received 57 DC-7s as new build aircraft.
United States Forest Service
Universal Airlines
US Overseas Airlines
Vance International Airways
Zantop Air Transport

Military operators

Colombian Air Force 1 x DC-7B and 1 x DC-7C

French Air Force 3 x DC-7C

Mexican Air Force 1 x DC-7B

 Nigerian Air Force - 1 × DC-7C briefly operated in 1968 during the Biafran War

Rhodesian Air Force 1 x DC-7C

References

 
  

DC-7